Lateefa Al Gaood (Arabic: لطيفه القعود) is a Bahraini politician. 

In 2006, she became the first female candidate to be elected to the Council of Representatives of Bahrain. She won by default after the other two candidates in her constituency withdrew from the race in the middle of October before campaigning began. She was also the first woman in the Persian Gulf region to win in a legislative general election. She represents the sixth constituency of the Southern Governorate. Due to her previous electoral failure she stood for a different constituency in 2006 to increase her chances of getting elected. She is currently the only female member of the Council of Representatives. 

She graduated from the University of Nottingham in 1996. She also holds diplomas from Helwan University in Egypt as well as the Darden Graduate School of Business Administration in Virginia. She used to work for the Bahraini Ministry of Finance.

See also
Bahrain election 2006 women candidates

References

External links

Bahraini women in politics
Members of the Council of Representatives (Bahrain)
Alumni of the University of Nottingham
University of Virginia Darden School of Business alumni
Year of birth missing (living people)
Living people
Helwan University alumni
21st-century Bahraini women politicians
21st-century Bahraini politicians